Mount Murchison is a dome-shaped, mostly snow-covered mountain,  high, on the west side of the Mertz Glacier, about  southwest of the head of Buchanan Bay. It was discovered by the Australasian Antarctic Expedition (1911–14) under Douglas Mawson, who named it for Roderick Murchison of Melbourne, a patron of the expedition.

References
 

Mountains of George V Land